Western Institute of Technology at Taranaki (WITT) is the largest tertiary education institution in the province of Taranaki, New Zealand.

History
On 1 April 2020, WITT became a subsidiary of Te Pūkenga (the New Zealand Institute of Skills & Technology) alongside the 15 other Institutes of Technology and Polytechnics (ITPs). WITT will remain a subsidiary of Te Pūkenga until early January 2023 when it is fully merged into the national entity.

Campuses
The institute has two campuses around Taranaki; the main campus is situated in New Plymouth, and the other is located in Hawera. WITT is accredited by the New Zealand Qualifications Authority.

WITT also has a campus in Hamilton which is part of the New Zealand Institute Highway Technology, WITT's wholly owned subsidiary.

Curriculum
WITT offers programmes from Levels 1 to 9, including degrees and diplomas, apprenticeships and short courses.

References

Te Pūkenga – New Zealand Institute of Skills and Technology
Education in Taranaki
Hāwera
2020 disestablishments in New Zealand